The Democratic Alliance Federal Council (FedCo) is the governing and policy-making body of the Democratic Alliance, the official opposition party in South Africa. It sits when the party's Federal Congress is not in session. It has been chaired by Helen Zille since 2019 and she has three deputies to assist her: Thomas Walters, James Masango and Ashor Sarupen.

The FedCo's main counterpart is the National Executive Committee of the African National Congress.

Composition
The decision-making body consists of the following members:
 All of the Federal Executive (FedEx) members;
 The Chairperson of the Federal Legal Commission;
 The Provincial Chairpersons and the Provincial Finance Chairpersons;
 Regional chairpersons who preside over an area where the party received more than 80,000 votes in the latest general election;
 Twenty-four Members of Parliament (MPs);
 Twenty-four Members of the Provincial Legislatures (MPLs);
 Twenty-four municipal councillors;
 Twenty-four party members who do not hold public office;
 Up to six additional members approved by two-thirds of the members mentioned above;
 Two non-voting party staff members designated by each of the nine Provincial Chairpersons;

References

Democratic Alliance (South Africa)
Executive committees of political parties